Craterolophus is a genus of jellyfish. It is the only genus in the monotypic family Craterolophidae. Species of this genus are characterized by the absence of primary tentacles as well as the absence of longitudinal muscles running along the peduncle.

References

Amyostaurida
Medusozoa genera